Krasimir Durchov (born 19 May 1979) is a football defender from Bulgaria currently playing for Bansko in the South-West Third League.

Durchov previously captained PFC Vihren Sandanski before joining Rodopa Smolyan in July 2004. He played two Bulgarian first division matches for Rodopa before being released in late 2005.

In August 2017, Durchov joined his former club Bansko.

References

External links
 

Living people
1979 births
Bulgarian footballers
Association football defenders
OFC Vihren Sandanski players
PFC Rodopa Smolyan players
FC Bansko players
First Professional Football League (Bulgaria) players
Second Professional Football League (Bulgaria) players